John George Howard (born John Corby; July 27, 1803 – February 3, 1890) was the official surveyor and civil engineer for the government of Toronto in Upper Canada and later Canada. He was also the first professional architect in Toronto. He designed numerous public, commercial and residential buildings during the 19th century. In addition, he was the principal donor of High Park to the people of Toronto.

Personal life

Born as John Corby in Bengeo, Hertfordshire, England, he was the fourth of seven children of John and Sarah Corby. He attended a  boarding school in Hertford and spent two years at sea as a sailor before returning to England to become a carpenter and joiner. In 1824, he entered the architecture profession, articling for three years with a London architect, William Ford, who became his brother-in-law by marrying his older sister in 1825. He remained with Ford until his departure for Upper Canada. In London, he married the 24-year-old Jemima Frances Meikle on May 7, 1827.

In 1832, he met Mr. Cattermole of the Canada Land Company, leading to him immigrating to Upper Canada with his wife in 1832. It was at this time that he adopted the Howard surname. He himself gave two explanations. On February 11, 1834, when his change of name was revealed in a court case, he wrote to Lieutenant Governor Sir John Colborne's secretary, explaining that he was illegitimate, that when he was about 18 he had adopted the name Corby after the man his mother had subsequently married, and that he had assumed his 'proper name' when he left England. Later in life, he claimed direct descent from Thomas Howard, 4th Duke of Norfolk, through a 17th-century Howard who had adopted the name Corby from the ancestral estate Corby Castle, because of a family quarrel.

Howard and his wife remained married until her death, although he also maintained a lifelong relationship with Mary Williams, with whom he had three children. Howard and his wife had no children together. In 1877, Jemima Howard died of cancer. Howard lived until 1890, dying at his home, Colborne Lodge, in High Park.

The Howards are buried in High Park, and their cairn monument is near to Colborne Lodge. The monument was designed by Howard. The fence was brought from London, England. It dates to the 1700s and was formerly part of the fence around St Paul's Cathedral in London, which was designed by Christopher Wren. During its transport from England, the ship carrying the fence sank in the St. Lawrence River, and Howard arranged for the fence to be salvaged from the wreck.

Professional career
Howard was an associate of William Ford from 1824 to 1832, with one notable engineering project working on the Cromford Canal in Derbyshire, England. He is also known to have worked for Mr. Grayson of St. Luke's, London, superintending work on Leeds Castle.

When Howard arrived in Toronto (at that time still the town of York) in 1833, he was the first professional architect in the town. His first public appointment was as a teaching master at Upper Canada College (UCC), while developing an architectural practice. He remained affiliated with UCC until 1856. His practice thrived, with commissions ranging from cottages to banks to public projects, including Queen's College at Kingston, Ontario, and the Provincial Lunatic Asylum in Toronto (modeled on the National Gallery in London).

Howard started surveying work in 1836, and he became Toronto's official surveyor in 1843, a position he held until 1855. He surveyed Toronto Harbour, laid out the 'Esplanade' on the waterfront, and subdivided the harbour's peninsula (now known as Toronto Island). He also did surveying work for cemeteries and private land sub-divisions. In 1883, the Governor-General of Canada conferred upon him the dignity of "Royal Canadian Academician."

In other endeavours, Howard was involved with the militia which put down William Lyon Mackenzie's 1837 rebellion. Howard is recorded as leading the scouting party which found the rebels' location on December 7, 1837. He would become a lieutenant the following year. In 1841, Howard received a license to practice as a public notary. In 1847, Howard was named president of a copper mine on Lake Huron. In 1848, Howard served as president and treasurer of the Toronto Society of Arts. In 1853, Howard was appointed a Justice of the Peace for a term of four years.

Howard bought some land of his own, including the property now known as High Park, which he intended as a sheep farm. To the east of High Park, Howard owned Sunnyside Farm, on which he built Sunnyside Villa. It is now the site of St. Joseph's Health Centre. The area retains the nickname of 'Sunnyside'. The remaining  and Colborne Lodge became city property at his death. Howard was appointed as forest ranger by the city in 1878, with responsibility for improving the park.

Notable projects

Paintings by John George Howard

References

External links

John George Howard – Biographical Dictionary of Architects in Canada (1800-1950)
Photo and information about Howard gravestone

Canadian civil engineers
1803 births
1890 deaths
19th-century Canadian architects
Members of the Royal Canadian Academy of Arts